The Accelerator Test Facility (BNL-ATF) is a user facility within the Brookhaven National Laboratory (BNL) in New York, USA. Commencing operation in 1992, the BNL-ATF carries out research and development on advanced accelerator physics and studies the interactions of high power electromagnetic radiation and high brightness electron beams, including plasma-acceleration and laser-acceleration of electrons.

References

External links
BNL-ATF home page

Particle accelerators
Brookhaven National Laboratory